The 2013 All England Super Series Premier was the third super series tournament of the 2013 BWF Super Series. The tournament was held in Birmingham, England, from 5 to 10 March 2013. A qualification was held to fill four places in all five disciplines of the main draws.

Men's singles

Seeds

  Lee Chong Wei (final)
  Chen Long (champion)
  Du Pengyu (first round)
  Sony Dwi Kuncoro (second round)
  Chen Jin (quarterfinals)
  Hu Yun (first round)
  Kenichi Tago (second round)
  Nguyen Tien Minh (quarterfinals)

Top half

Bottom half

Finals

Women's singles

Seeds

  Li Xuerui (first round)
  Saina Nehwal (semifinals)
  Wang Yihan (first round)
  Juliane Schenk (quarterfinals)
  Sung Ji-Hyun (semifinals)
  Wang Shixian (quarterfinals)
  Tine Baun (champion)
  Ratchanok Inthanon (final)

Top half

Bottom half

Finals

Men's doubles

Seeds

  Mathias Boe / Carsten Mogensen (second round)
  Koo Kien Keat / Tan Boon Heong (second round)
  Ko Sung-Hyun / Lee Yong-Dae (first round)
  Hiroyuki Endo / Kenichi Hayakawa (final)
  Hong Wei / Shen Ye (first round)
  Kim Ki-Jung / Kim Sa-Rang (quarterfinals)
  Cai Yun / Fu Haifeng (first round)
  Mohammad Ahsan / Hendra Setiawan (semifinals)

Top half

Bottom half

Finals

Women's doubles

Seeds

  Wang Xiaoli / Yu Yang (champion)
  Christinna Pedersen / Kamilla Rytter Juhl (first round)
  Misaki Matsutomo / Ayaka Takahashi (first round)
  Eom Hye-Won / Jang Ye-Na (second round)
  Ma Jin / Tang Jinhua (semifinals)
  Miyuki Maeda / Satoko Suetsuna (semifinals)
  Jung Kyung-Eun / Kim Ha-Na (quarterfinals)
  Duanganong Aroonkesorn / Kunchala Voravichitchaikul (quarterfinals)

Top half

Bottom half

Finals

Mixed doubles

Seeds

  Xu Chen / Ma Jin (quarterfinals)
  Tontowi Ahmad/ Lilyana Natsir (champion)
  Chan Peng Soon / Goh Liu Ying (second round)
  Joachim Fischer Nielsen / Christinna Pedersen (first round)
  Zhang Nan / Zhao Yunlei (final)
  Sudket Prapakamol / Saralee Thoungthongkam (quarterfinals)
  Muhammad Rijal / Debby Susanto (semi-final)
  Robert Mateusiak / Nadiezda Zieba (quarterfinals)

Top half

Bottom half

Finals

External links 
Results

2013 All England Super Series Premier
All England Super Series Premier
All England Premier
All England Super Series Premier
Sports competitions in Birmingham, West Midlands